Casa del Rey, the "King's House," is a historic place in the town of Dorado, in Puerto Rico.  It is also known as Cuartel de la Guardia de Milicias, Parador, or Carcel Municipal.

It was constructed as a parador, or inn, about 1823.  The building, the oldest in town, provided housing for Spanish government personnel, and also served as the regional military headquarters.

In 1848, Jacinto López purchased the structure.  In converting it into a residence, López added two wings which created a U-shaped configuration around an interior patio. In 1871, Casa del Rey became the home of Manuel Alonso y Pacheco, Puerto Rico's notable romantic writer.

It was listed on the U.S. National Register of Historic Places in 1989.

The house was restored by the Institute of Puerto Rican Culture in 1978 and is now a local history museum.

See also

 Paradores in Puerto Rico

References

External links
 
 Casa del Rey - National Park Service information about the museum

History museums in Puerto Rico
Museums in Dorado, Puerto Rico
Government buildings completed in 1823
Residential buildings completed in 1823
Spanish Colonial architecture in Puerto Rico
Hotel buildings completed in 1823
Hotel buildings on the National Register of Historic Places in Puerto Rico
1820s establishments in Puerto Rico
1823 establishments in the Spanish Empire
National Register of Historic Places in Dorado, Puerto Rico